Kiu is a settlement in Kenya's Eastern Province.KIU, a local drama is set to premiere on StarTimes this December 12, 2022. The drama boasts of a star-studded en emble with notable industry heavyweights in the lead roles; Blessing Lungaho (Alex) and Celestine Gachuhi (Alisha) play a married couple. Other notable performers in the top billed drama include Anita Wawuda, Joyce Maina, Derek Mbanga Reinherd Bonke, Chantelle Naisula and Linda Waiganjo among others.

References 

Populated places in Eastern Province (Kenya)